Jaguariaíva is a municipality in the state of Paraná in the Southern Region of Brazil.

The municipality of Jaguariaíva is located at 24°15'04 S and 49°42'21 W with an area of 1,453 km2. The municipality began as an overnight resting point for muleteers troops in the late Seventeenth century. It has undergone a forestry and pulp industry boom throughouth the Twentieth Century. Consequently, nowadays Jaguariaíva supplies the Brazilian and international markets with resin, cheap wood for construction, plywood, paper pulp, lightweight coated and newsprint papers.

The municipality contains part of the  Cerrado State Park, created in 1992.

Education

União Latino-Americana de Tecnologia

See also
List of municipalities in Paraná

References